Rylsk may refer to:
Rylsk, Russia, a town in Kursk Oblast, Russia
Rylsk, Łódź Voivodeship, a village in Łódź Voivodeship, Poland